Donald is an unincorporated community in Jefferson County, in the U.S. state of Montana. It is located on Montana Highway 2, 15 miles south of Butte. It is near the Beaver Ponds Trailhead and Toll Mountain in the Beaverhead–Deerlodge National Forest.

History
The community was named in honor of Donald A. McIntosh, a railroad contractor.

References

Unincorporated communities in Jefferson County, Montana
Unincorporated communities in Montana